Heinrich Breloer (born 17 February 1942 in Gelsenkirchen) is a German author and film director. He has mainly worked on docudramas related to modern German history and has received many awards. Breloer's 2005 docudrama Speer und Er was described as a milestone in the understanding of Nazi Germany by the German people.

Selected filmography 
  (co-director: , 1982, TV film) — based on a novel by Arnold Zweig
 Treffpunkt im Unendlichen (co-director: Horst Königstein, 1984, TV film) — based on a novel by Klaus Mann
  (1987, TV film)
 The State Chancellery (1989, TV film) — (about Uwe Barschel)
  (1993, TV film) — (about Herbert Wehner)
  (1997, TV film) — (about the German Autumn)
 Die Manns – Ein Jahrhundertroman (2001, TV miniseries) — (about Thomas Mann)
 Speer und Er (2005, TV miniseries) — (about Albert Speer)
 Buddenbrooks (2008) — based on the novel Buddenbrooks by Thomas Mann
 Brecht (2019, TV film) — (about Bertolt Brecht)

External links 

 

Heinrich Breloer  at SWR1 - Leute, 7 January 2009, with MP3 file, 28:43 Min. and 25 December 2008 
Bio on ARTE
Interview with Der Spiegel, 24 November 2008

References 

Mass media people from North Rhine-Westphalia
1942 births
Living people
People from Gelsenkirchen